Rudolf Höpfler (22 January 1912 – ?) was an Austrian rower. He competed at the 1936 Summer Olympics in Berlin with the men's coxless four where they came fifth.

References

1912 births
Year of death missing
Austrian male rowers
Olympic rowers of Austria
Rowers at the 1936 Summer Olympics
European Rowing Championships medalists